Storey Racing is a professional road bicycle racing women's team, founded in 2017, which participates in elite women's races.

Major results
2017
Derby Cyclo-cross, Bethany Crumpton
Abergavenny Cyclo-cross, Bethany Crumpton
UCI Track World Cup – Manchester (Team Pursuit), Neah Evans

2018
Ipswich Cyclo-cross, Bethany Crumpton
Overall British National Cyclo-cross Trophy, Bethany Crumpton
Lincoln Grand Prix, Rebecca Durrell
Melton Mowbray–Cicle Classic, Neah Evans
Derby Cyclo-cross, Bethany Crumpton
Irvine Cyclo-cross, Ffion James
Ardingly Cyclo-cross, Anna Kay
UCI Track World Cup – Germany (Team Pursuit), Emily Nelson
UCI Track World Cup – Germany (Madison), Emily Nelson
Ipswich Cyclo-cross II, Bethany Crumpton
UCI Track World Cup – London (Team Pursuit), Neah Evans

2019
Overall British National Cyclo-cross Trophy, Zoe Backstedt
Gent–Wevelgem Juniors, Elynor Backstedt
Overall Omloop van Borsele Juniors, Elynor Backstedt
Stages 1 & 2, Elynor Backstedt
Koppenberg Cyclo-cross, Zoe Backstedt
Mollecross Cyclo-cross, Zoe Backstedt
Zonhoven Cyclo-cross, Zoe Backstedt
Waaslandcross Sint-Niklaas, Zoe Backstedt
Balegem Cyclo-cross, Zoe Backstedt
Bredene Cyclo-cross, Zoe Backstedt

Continental Championships
2018
 World Track (Madison), Emily Nelson
 European Track (Team pursuit), Neah Evans

2019
 Great Britain Cyclo-cross (Debutants), Zoe Backstedt
 Ireland Time Trial, Kelly Murphy
 European Junior Track (Team pursuit), Elynor Backstedt
 European Junior Track (Madison), Elynor Backstedt

Team roster

References

UCI Women's Teams
Cycling teams based in the United Kingdom
Cycling teams established in 2017